Lemonias is a genus of butterflies belonging to the family Lycaenidae.

The species of this genus are found in America.

Species:

Lemonias agave 
Lemonias caliginea 
Lemonias egaensis 
Lemonias zygia

References

Lycaenidae